Zoning is the process of dividing land in a municipality into zones in which certain land uses are permitted or prohibited.

Zoning may also refer to:

 Zoning (Australian rules football), an area reserved exclusively for one club
 Zoning (Mary Lou Williams album), 1974
 Zoning (Tangerine Dream album), 1996
 Facing (retail) or zoning, a tool in the retail industry to create the look of a perfectly stocked store
 Zoning, a series of tactics a player uses in fighting games to keep their opponent at a specific distance. 
 Zoning, a geological property common in phenocrysts